Jerzy Kowalewski (born 6 May 1944) is a retired Polish diver. He competed in the 3 m springboard and 10 m platform at the 1960 and 1968 Summer Olympics with the best achievement of 15th place in the platform in 1960. He won a bronze medal in the platform at the 1966 European Aquatics Championships. Nationally, he won six titles in the springboard (1959, 1962, 1963, 1965, 1966, 1967) and six in the platform  (1959, 1963, 1965, 1966, 1967, 1970).

Kowalewski graduated from a medical university in Warsaw. Since 1970 he lives in Canada where he owns a clinic in Toronto. He is married to Anita Kowalewski; they have a son Daniel (born 1980) and a daughter Agate.

References

1944 births
Living people
Polish male divers
Olympic divers of Poland
Divers at the 1960 Summer Olympics
Divers at the 1968 Summer Olympics
People from Vawkavysk
Universiade medalists in diving
Universiade bronze medalists for Poland
Medalists at the 1965 Summer Universiade
20th-century Polish people